Limannoye is a rural locality (a selo) and the administrative center of Limannovsky Selsoviet of Seryshevsky District, Amur Oblast, Russia. The population was 241 as of 2018. There are 5 streets.

Geography 
Limannoye is located 40 km northeast of Seryshevo (the district's administrative centre) by road. Vernoye is the nearest rural locality.

References 

Rural localities in Seryshevsky District